Girls und Panzer is a 2012 original Japanese animated television series produced by Actas. Directed by Tsutomu Mizushima and written by Reiko Yoshida, the series is set in a timeline where girls' high schools compete in a sport involving tanks called . Girls und Panzer has been adapted into several books such as manga, light novels, and mooks.

Manga

Girls und Panzer

Girls und Panzer: Little Army

Girls und Panzer: Comic Anthology

Girls und Panzer: It's More Love Love Operation!

Girls und Panzer: Comic Anthology Side

Girls und Panzer: Ribbon Warrior

Girls und Panzer: Fierce Fight! It's the Maginot Battle!!

Girls und Panzer: Little Army II

Girls und Panzer: 4-koma Comic Anthology

Girls und Panzer: Phase Erika

Girls und Panzer: Tankery Recommendation

Daily Life of Girls und Panzer: 4-koma Comic Anthology

Complementaries

Girls und Panzer: 4-koma Panzer Vor!

Girls und Panzer: Saga of Pravda

Girls und Panzer: Avanti! Anzio Girls' High School

Girls und Panzer: The Fir Tree and the Iron-winged Witch

Girls und Panzer: Gekiga

Light novel

Girls und Panzer

Mooks and other books

Achtung Girls und Panzer

Girls und Panzer Modeling Book

Ōarai Garupan Travel Guide

Monthly Tankery

Special issues

Extra issues

Encyclopedia of Girls und Panzer

Rurubu Girls und Panzer

Girls und Panzer: Senshado no Yokomichi

Girls und Panzer Walker

See also
 List of Girls und Panzer der Film books
 List of Girls und Panzer das Finale manga

References

Girls und Panzer
Girls und Panzer